Terrance Dotsy (born November 24, 1981) is a former American football lineman who played four seasons with the Dallas Desperados of the Arena Football League. He first enrolled at Ventura College before transferring to the University of California, Berkeley. Dotsy was also a member of the Quad City Steamwheelers of the af2.

Early years
Dotsy played high school football at Santa Clara High School in Oxnard, California. He was a three-year starter at both tight end and defensive end for the Saints. He also started three seasons as a pitcher and first baseman on the baseball team. Dotsy was a starter on Santa Clara's state championship basketball team in 1999. He was named Santa Clara High School Athlete of the Year for 1998-99.

College career
Dotsy played his first season of college football as a tight end for the Ventura Pirates of Ventura College in 1999. He was the team's third-leading receiver and was also a big factor in a rushing attack that averaged over 200 yards a game. He was named the team's Freshman of the Year and earned honorable mention Western State Conference honors.

Dotsy transferred to play for the California Golden Bears of the University of California, Berkeley from 2000 to 2002. He missed the first two games of his freshman season in 2000 due to a hand injury. He played in eight games in 2000, recording one solo tackle and one forced fumble. Dotsy played in 11 games in 2001, catching 3 passes for 26 yards. Prior to the 2002 season, Dotsy switched positions from tight end to defensive end. He missed the entire 2002 season due to an MCL tear in his knee. He majored in social welfare at California.

Professional career
Dotsy played for the Quad City Steamwheelers of the af2 in 2004. He joined the team eleven games into the season, recording 4.5 tackles, including one for a loss, one sack, four pressures, one forced fumble and one pass breakup. He added a rushing score and a ten-yard catch on offense.

Dotsy signed with the Dallas Desperados on October 18, 2004. He played for the Desperados from 2005 to 2008, earning Second Team All-Arena honors in 2007.

Dotsy had a workout with the Dallas Cowboys in 2007.

References

External links
Just Sports Stats
College stats

Living people
1981 births
Players of American football from California
American football offensive linemen
American football defensive linemen
American football tight ends
African-American players of American football
Ventura College alumni
Ventura Pirates football players
California Golden Bears football players
Quad City Steamwheelers players
Dallas Desperados players
Sportspeople from Oxnard, California
21st-century African-American sportspeople
20th-century African-American people